Halsa Church is a parish church of the Church of Norway in Meløy Municipality in Nordland county, Norway. It is located in the village of Halsa. It is the church for the Halsa parish which is part of the Bodø domprosti (deanery) in the Diocese of Sør-Hålogaland. The white, wooden church was built in a long church style in 1960 using plans drawn up by the architect Kirsten Wleügel Knutssøn. The church seats about 400 people. The building was consecrated on 22 May 1960 by the Bishop Hans Edvard Wisløff.

See also
List of churches in Sør-Hålogaland

References

Meløy
Churches in Nordland
Wooden churches in Norway
20th-century Church of Norway church buildings
Churches completed in 1960
1960 establishments in Norway
Long churches in Norway